Scottish Insurance Corp Ltd v Wilsons & Clyde Coal Co Ltd [1949] AC 462 is a UK company law case concerning shares. It illustrates that where the rights of shares are explained in the articles, that is likely to be an exhaustive statement.

Facts
Wilsons & Clyde Coal Co Ltd was nationalised under the Coal Industry Nationalisation Act 1946. The company's assets were transferred to the National Coal Board, and the company was waiting for reimbursement. In advance of liquidation the company procured a special resolution for reduction of capital, whereby all paid up capital would be returned to preference shareholders, to settle any claims. The aim was to eliminate them from the company, so ordinary shareholders could get excesses from compulsory purchase compensation. The preference shareholders, including Scottish Insurance Corp Ltd complained that they should be able to share in the proceeds from liquidated assets.

Judgment
The House of Lords held that preference shareholders had no right to share in surplus assets, so it could not be said that the scheme was not fair and equitable. Lord Simonds said the following

See also

UK company law
Wilsons and Clyde Coal Ltd v English [1938] AC 57

Notes

References

United Kingdom company case law
1949 in British law
1949 in Scotland
House of Lords cases
Coal in Scotland
1949 in case law